Mandikudar is a small village situated near the outskirts of steel township Rourkela. Its jurisdiction is entitled to town of Kansbahal. Mandiakudar got its name from a staple crop named "Mandia" which was cultivated by poor people in that area. The village is about one kilometer away from Kansbahal situated in between State Highways SH 24 and SH 10.

Mandiakudar gained popularity because of the proximity of engineering colleges residing in the area. Most popularly the Degree and Diploma college of Purushottam Institute of Engineering and Technology (PIET) situated there. The nearest community hospital is at village of Beldihi. There is a small post office run by Indian postal department in the campus of PIET.

At present day Mandiakudar is known as food hub for travellers. Starting from breakfast to dinning, people can find numbers of Dhaba's over here.

Economy
Residents of Mandiakudar gain their economy from running restaurant and stationary shops near the campus of Purushottam Institute of Engineering and Technology. It has a small petrol pump of Indian Oil and atwo small scale steel workshops near to the campus of PIET.

Transport
The village is situated near the state highway of SH 24 and SH 10 and has frequent local buses and express buses traveling from Sambalpur to Rourkela and vice versa.

See also
Kansbahal

References

Sundergarh district
Cities and towns in Sundergarh district